Below is an alphabetical list of plants occurring in the Ngorongoro Crater in Tanzania.

Ngorongoro Crater covers an area of 265 square kilometres and is thought to have been formed from the collapse of a volcanic mountain which had become inactive. Its rim lies some 2280 meters above sea level, while the floor is at 1800 meters. The diversity of landforms and altitude has produced similarly diverse habitats of mountains, gallery forests, craters, grassy plains, black folk, lakes and woodlands, ranging from arid and semi-arid communities below 1,300 m with abundant grazing to montane vegetation with tall grassland, open moors and relict evergreen montane forests on the steep slopes. There is a large stand of bamboo, Yushania alpina, on Oldeani (an extinct volcano of 3,188 meters) and Pencil Cedar, Juniperus procera, on Makarut Mountain. There are four extinct volcanic peaks, all over 3,000 meters, the highest of which is Loolmalasin (3,648 m). Within the crater lies Lake Magadi, a small soda lake. (Hillary Remen)

The crater floor consists of shortgrass savanna punctuated by shallow, fresh and brackish lakes, marshes and swamps. Two notable forests are Lerai Forest and Laiyanai Forest, while the surrounds of Lake Eyasi are dominated by Acacia mellifera and Dalbergia melanoxylon during the dry season.

Trees, shrubs and lianes
Abutilon indicum (L.) Sweet
Abutilon longicuspe Hochst. ex A.Rich.
Abutilon mauritianum (Jacq.) Medik.
Acacia abyssinica Benth.
Acacia drepanolobium Sjostedt
Acacia gerrardii Benth.
Acacia hockii De Wild.
Acacia lahai Benth.
Acacia mearnsii De Wild.
Acacia mellifera subsp. detinens (Burch.) Brenan	
Acacia nilotica (L.) Delile
Acacia oerfota (Forssk.) Schweinf.
Acacia senegal (L.) Willd.
Acacia seyal Delile
Acacia tortilis (Forssk.) Hayne
Acacia xanthophloea Benth.
Adansonia digitata L.
Aeschynomene schimperi A.Rich.
Albizia gummifera (J.F.Gmel.) C.A.Sm.
Albizia harveyi E.Fourn.
Albizia petersiana (Bolle) Oliv.
Azanza garckeana (F.Hoffm.) Exell & Hillc.
Balanites aegyptiaca (L.) Delile
Bersama abyssinica Fresen.
Cadaba farinosa Forssk.
Caesalpinia decapetala (Roth) Alston
Calodendrum capense (L.f.) Thunb.
Capparis fascicularis DC.
Capparis tomentosa Lam.
Cassipourea malosana (Baker) Alston
Celtis africana Burm.f.
Cissus cactiformis Gilg
Cissus quadrangularis L.
Clausena anisata (Willd.) Hook.f. ex Benth.
Clutia abyssinica Jaub. & Spach
Commiphora africana (A.Rich.) Endl.
Commiphora madagascariensis Jacq.
Combretum apiculatum Sond.
Combretum molle R.Br. ex G.Don
Cordia ovalis R. Br.
Cordia sinensis Lam.
Coptosperma graveolens (S.Moore) Degreef
Crotalaria agatiflora subsp. imperialis (Taub.) Polhill	
Croton dichogamus Pax
Croton macrostachyus Hochst. ex Delile
Cussonia holstii Harms ex Engl.
Cussonia spicata Thunb.
Dalbergia melanoxylon Guill. & Perr.
Dombeya rotundifolia (Hochst.) Planch.
Ekebergia capensis Sparrm.
Erica arborea L.
Erythrina abyssinica DC.
Euclea divinorum Hiern
Euphorbia candelabrum Trémaux ex Kotschy
Euphorbia schimperi C.Presl
Euphorbia tirucalli
Faidherbia albida (Delile) A.Chev.
Ficus thonningii Blume
Grewia damine Gaertn.
Gutenbergia cordifolia Benth. ex Oliv.
Hagenia abyssinica (Bruce ex Steud.) J.F.Gmel.
Helichrysum splendidum (Thunb.) Less.
Heteromorpha trifoliata (H.L.Wendl.) Eckl. & Zeyh.
Hibiscus aponeurus Sprague & Hutch.
Hibiscus flavifolius Ulbr.
Hyphaene petersiana Klotzsch ex Mart.
Hypoestes verticillaris (L.f.) Sol. ex Roem. & Schult.
Indigofera arrecta A.Rich.	
Juniperus procera Hochst. ex Endl.
Justicia matammensis (Schweinf.) Oliv.
Lantana camara L.
Lantana trifolia L.
Lantana ukambensis (Vatke) Verdc.
Lantana viburnoides (Forssk.) Vahl
Lasiosiphon glaucus Fresen.
Leonotis ocymifolia var. raineriana (Vis.) Iwarsson	
Lippia javanica (Burm.f.) Spreng.
Lonicera japonica Thunb.
Markhamia zanzibarica (Bojer ex DC.) K.Schum.
Melhania ovataSpreng.
Nuxia congesta R.Br. ex Fresen.
Olea capensis subsp. macrocarpa (C.H.Wright) I.Verd.
Olea europaea subsp. cuspidata (Wall. & G.Don) Cif.
Olea welwitschii (Knobl.) Gilg & G.Schellenb.
Ozoroa insignis subsp. reticulata (Baker f.) J.B.Gillett
Pavonia burchellii (DC.) R.A.Dyer
Pluchea ovalis (Pers.) DC.
Podocarpus milanjianus Rendle
Rauvolfia caffra Sond.
Salvadora persica L.
Senna didymobotrya (Fresen.) H.S.Irwin & Barneby
Sida ovata Forssk.
Solanecio mannii (Hook.f.) C.Jeffrey
Stigmatorhynchus umbelliferus (K. Schum.) Schltr.
Terminalia brownii Fresen.
Tinnea aethiopica Kotschy ex Hook.f.
Trifolium rueppellianum Fresen.
Vangueria madagascariensis J.F.Gmel.
Vepris nobilis (Delile) Mziray
Vernonia auriculifera Hiern
Zanthoxylum chalybeum Engl.
Ziziphus mucronata Willd.

Herbs
Acalypha fruticosa Forssk.
Achyranthes aspera L.
Anthospermum usambarense K.Schum.
Argemone mexicana L.
Artemisia afra Jacq. ex Willd.
Aspilia mossambicensis (Oliv.) Wild
Bidens schimperi Sch.Bip. ex Walp.
Datura stramonium L.
Galatella sedifolia (L.) Greuter
Heliotropium steudneri Vatke 
Justicia betonica L.
Medicago laciniata (L.) Mill.
Murdannia nudiflora (L.) Brenan
Nicandra physalodes (L.) Gaertn.
Ocimum gratissimum L.
Sansevieria ehrenbergii Schweinf. ex Baker
Solanum incanum L.
Spilanthes mauritiana (A.Rich. ex Pers.) DC.
Tagetes minuta L.
Tribulus terrestris L.

Sedges
Cyperus dives Delile
Cyperus laevigatus L.
Cyperus papyrus L.
Cyperus rigidifolius Steud.
Cyperus rotundus L.

Grasses
Andropogon greenwayi Napper
Aristida adscensionis L.
Bothriochloa insculpta (A.Rich.) A.Camus
Brachiaria eruciformis (Sm.) Griseb.
Brachiaria umbratilis Napper
Cenchrus ciliaris L.
Chloris gayana Kunth
Chloris pycnothrix Trin.
Cymbopogon nardus (L.) Rendle
Cynodon dactylon (L.) Pers.
Cynodon nlemfuensis Vanderyst
Cynodon plectostachyus (K.Schum.) Pilg.
Dactyloctenium aegyptium (L.) Willd.
Digitaria abyssinica (A.Rich.) Stapf
Digitaria milanjiana (Rendle) Stapf
Eleusine jaegeri Pilg.
Enneapogon persicus Boiss.
Eragrostis patula (Kunth) Steud.
Eustachys paspaloides (Vahl) Lanza & Mattei
Harpachne schimperi A.Rich.
Heteropogon contortus (L.) P.Beauv. ex Roem. & Schult.
Hyparrhenia hirta (L.) Stapf
Leersia hexandra Sw.
Leptochloa fusca (L.) Kunth
Odyssea paucinervis Stapf
Panicum coloratum L.
Panicum repens L.
Pennisetum clandestinum Hochst. ex Chiov.
Pennisetum riparium Hochst. ex A.Rich.
Pennisetum sphacelatum (Nees) T.Durand & Schinz	
Phragmites mauritianus Kunth
Setaria pumila (Poir.) Roem. & Schult.
Setaria sphacelata (Schumach.) Stapf & C.E.Hubb. ex Moss	
Sporobolus indicus (L.) R.Br.
Sporobolus consimilis Fresen.
Sporobolus fimbriatus (Trin.) Nees
Sporobolus ioclados (Trin.) Nees
Sporobolus sanguineus Rendle
Sporobolus spicatus (Vahl) Kunth
Themeda triandra Forssk.
Urochloa panicoides P.Beauv.
Yushania alpina (K.Schum.) W.C.Lin

References

https://www.inaturalist.org/guides/467

.Ngorongoro Crater
Ngorongoro Crater plants
Ngorongoro Crater
Ngorongoro Crater Plants
Ngorongoro Crater Plants
Ngorongoro Crater Plants